Blind Man's Bluff (Spanish: La gallina ciega) is one of the Rococo oil-on-linen cartoons produced by the Spanish artist Francisco de Goya for tapestries for the Royal Palace of El Pardo. The work shows boys and girls playing the popular pastime "blind man's bluff" with one figure in the middle blindfolded and holding a large spoon while trying to entice others dancing around him in a circle.

The youngsters are dressed in the attire of Spanish aristocrats. Some wear velvet jackets and feather headdresses. As an example of Goya's Rococo period, it is typically lively and captures a charming moment of life, with a soft color scheme of pink and yellow in the skirts of women and luminous background scenery.

See also
 List of Francisco Goya's tapestry cartoons
List of works by Francisco Goya

Sources
 Bozal, Valeriano. Francisco Goya, vida y obra., Madrid, Tf, 2005. 64. .

External links

Paintings by Francisco Goya in the Museo del Prado
1789 paintings
Dance in art
Tapestry cartoons